Spindle cell lipoma is an asymptomatic, slow-growing subcutaneous tumor that has a predilection for the posterior back, neck, and shoulders of older men.

See also 
 Intradermal spindle cell lipoma
 List of cutaneous conditions

References

External links 

Dermal and subcutaneous growths